Port Harcourt Air Force Base is located in Rumuomasi, a city in the Rivers State of Nigeria. It is a base owned by the Nigerian Air Force. It gained popularity as a commercial destination due to the temporary closure of Port Harcourt International Airport for repairs. After that airport reopened, most airlines abandoned the base. However, it still has some destinations since the airport is closer to the center than the main airport. It hosts and houses two schools (Air Force Secondary School), and (Air Force Primary School). It is an essential centre for both domestic and military flight service in the state and country at large.

References

External links

Airports in Rivers State
Buildings and structures in Port Harcourt